Nineigara (also transcribed as Nine'igara) was a Mesopotamian goddess associated with dairy products. She was regarded as the wife of the god of cattle, Ningublaga, and like him belonged to the court of the moon god Nanna.

Name and character
Nineigara's name can be translated as "lady of the house of butter and cream." On this basis, it is assumed that she was regarded as the goddess of dairy products.

Ningublaga, a god associated with cattle, was Nineigara's husband. Based on this connection it is presumed that she also belonged to the court of the moon god Nanna. According to Jeremy Black, she functioned as the divine housekeeper of his temple Ekišnugal in Ur. Nineigara and Ningublaga appear together in the Lament for Sumer and Ur, where the former laments the departure of the former and the destruction of their home. They are also mentioned side by side in multiple god lists, including An = Anum and its Old Babylonian forerunner, as well as the Mari god list.

Worship
Nineigara was worshiped in a temple bearing the ceremonial name Eigara, "house of butterfat," whose location is presently unknown. The Canonical Temple List erroneously attributes it to Ningublaga instead. A temple dairy located in Girsu bore the same name. Nineigara was also worshiped in the main temple of her husband, Egaburra, "house of bur jars," located in Kiabrig. An unpublished hymn indicates that she also had a temple in Šadunni which was named Egainunšaršar, "house which provides a profusion of milk and ghee." According to Andrew R. George, it is also likely that one of the temples bearing the name Ebursasa, "house of beautiful jars," was dedicated to a courtier of the moon god, with Nineigara, Ningublaga and Alammuš all being plausible candidates for this role. This Ebursasa should not be confused with two other houses of worship sharing its name, located in Umma and in Babylon, both of which were dedicated to Shara.

Many offering lists from Ur from the Ur III period mention Nineigara. She appears in one of them alongside Ningublaga and Alammuš. She is also grouped with the latter god and Nisaba in a number of similar documents, possibly based on their shares association with food: Nisaba was associated with grain, while a connection with syrup has been proposed for Alammuš.

An inscription of king Lipit-Ishtar of Isin dealing with the installation of his daughter Enninsunzi as the en priestess of Ningublaga in Ur mentions that her new position will make her the "true stewardess" of Nineigara as well.

References

Bibliography

 

Mesopotamian goddesses
Food goddesses